The Ducha-class large harbor tug (YTB) is a very little known naval auxiliary ship/tugboat currently in service with the People's Liberation Army Navy (PLAN). The exact type still remains unknown, but it has received NATO reporting name Ducha class. More than a dozen of this type have been confirmed in active service as of early-2020s, making it one of the most numerous class of tugs in Chinese service. The Ducha class is a design of single deck with three levels of superstructures, with the top level retracted backward from the edge of the bottom two levels.

The Ducha-class tugs in PLAN service are designated by a combination of two Chinese characters followed by three-digit number. The second Chinese character is Tuo (拖), meaning tug in Chinese, because these ships are classified as tugboats. The first Chinese character denotes which fleet the ship is service with, with East (Dong, 东) for East Sea Fleet, North (Bei, 北) for North Sea Fleet, and South (Nan, 南) for South Sea Fleet. However, the pennant numbers are subject to change due to changes of Chinese naval ships naming convention, or when units are transferred to different fleets. Specification:
Length: 30 meter

References

Auxiliary tugboat classes
Auxiliary ships of the People's Liberation Army Navy